Mary Jane Alexander (born July 18, 1961) is an American writer and photographer, playwright, poet, and lyricist who documents people and places of the American West, with an emphasis on infants, centenarians and American Indian culture. She was inducted into the Oklahoma Journalism Hall of Fame in 2019.

Documentary work
Alexander "combines the vision of an artist with the skills of a storyteller," according to the International Photography Hall of Fame and Museum. Her photographs have been featured in more than 20 solo shows since 2006, including at the Oklahoma State Capitol, the Red Earth Museum, and the Main Gallery of the International Photography Hall of Fame. Her iconic portrait of Thomas Jefferson Brown, 103, was named one of the top photographs in Oklahoma history by the editors of Oklahoma Today magazine.

She is author and illustrator of two books: Salt of the Red Earth: A Century of Wit and Wisdom from Oklahoma's Elders, portraits and interviews with 100 centenarians, including dozens born in Indian Territory and Portrait of a Generation - Children of Oklahoma: Sons and Daughters of the Red Earth featuring interviews with and environmental portraits of more than 250 Oklahomans from varied walks of life. The book launch and opening exhibit for Portrait of a Generation were hosted by the Oklahoma City Museum of Art; a collection of 36 of Alexander's fine art portraits was shown in the OKCMOA Founders' Gallery in 2011.  The book was a finalist in two categories and selected as top young adult book of the year at the 2011 Oklahoma Book Awards, sponsored by the Oklahoma Center for the Book.

Critical acclaim

Alexander was honored at the 2009 UNESCO-sponsored World Humanity Photography Awards in Guangzhou, China, for her photographic series on Apache Crown Dancers. Of her ongoing portrait series of indigenous peoples, a reviewer wrote: "Alexander’s imagery moves beyond stereotypes to reflect not only a difficult and challenging past but today’s American Indian renaissance and hopeful future….[offering] deep connection to the ancient and modern and to human transience. Now and then the earth shifts and if we're looking, art such as this can bring indescribable joy in the simple act of connecting to the human spirit. Such is the gift of Alexander's portraits."

"M.J. Alexander has a way of seeing the world that shows it to you," according to the writer Alice Walker. "The layers of it that are sometimes ignored or overlooked, especially in our country. A brilliant photographer." Suzanne Tate, executive director of the Oklahoma Arts Council, calls Alexander "a transcendent visual storyteller...Her distinct style and abilities as an artist make her an invaluable cultural asset." Heidi Evans of the New York Daily News calls the work "remarkable, moving photographs and words that reveal the inner lives and quiet power of ordinary people -- people you might otherwise pass by. M.J. Alexander shows the poetry deeply rooted in the Oklahoma -- and American -- landscape."

From a public radio feature on Alexander's "Salt of the Red Earth" centenarian project: "Many of us who work in radio would say that hearing the undoctored human voice is about as intimate as you can get. But take one look at M.J. Alexander’s stunning sepia-toned portraits of Oklahomans over 100 years old, and there’s a certain timeless quality that seems to capture the essence of who these people are for all eternity."

From a 2010 feature on the release of her second book: "The true storytellers mine deep into the hearts and souls of their subjects...M.J. Alexander knows well the power of storytelling that uses both words and images. This month sees the release of an extraordinary new book by the award-winning Oklahoma City photographer and writer, as she continues her exploration of the people who are the heart and soul of her adopted home state."

Alexander's writing and photo features have been recognized with several awards from the Society of Professional Journalists. Her portraits of Alice Walker and Gloria Steinem were featured on the cover of the Fall 2009 issue of Ms. magazine, commemorating Steinem’s 75th birthday. A second portrait of Walker by Alexander was the cover photograph of the October 2010 Writer's Digest, and was discussed by Walker on her personal blog.

Creative writing
Alexander is also a poet, playwright and lyricist. With her husband, composer Edward Knight, she has created two full-length musicals: Strike A Match (1999) and Night of the Comets (2001), both premiered at the Bass School of Music at Oklahoma City University. Cradle of Dreams, their work for chorus and orchestra, was commercially recorded by the Kyiv Philharmonic and the Kyiv Chamber Choir. Alexander and Knight’s song cycle, Tales Not Told, is based on her poems exploring the viewpoints of six American ancestors of the composer: Helen Harvey Tiffany Paddock, Patience Brewster, Keziah Keyes Ransom,  Sarah Town Bridges Cloyce, Bessie Barton Paddock, and Mary Dyer. The work has been performed in New York, Oklahoma and California, including by the San Francisco Cabaret Opera, and published by Subito Music. The work was the subject of a doctoral dissertation by Catherine McDaniel at the University of Oklahoma.  A national reviewer called the poems "beautiful" and the cycle "intriguing, heartfelt, and beautifully crafted."

Europe
Alexander and Knight collaborated on the European debut of "Oklahoma", a 2018 retrospective encompassing 20 years of interviews and photographs. The exhibit included more than 100 images accompanied by a sound installation created by Knight in The Crypt Gallery of London: "As visitors' eyes adjusted to the darkness, their ears were enveloped by the sounds of Oklahoma: pulsating waves of buzzing cicadas, ethereal prairie birdsong, rising and falling winds. Flickering candles and the long plaintive note of a lone cello beckoned from within the catacombs. Six-foot-tall canvas portraits and diaphanous scrims with larger-than-life images of centenarians were suspended from the ceiling, standing sentry in the arches surrounding the perimeter. Aluminum prints...marched down the 50-foot-long brick entry corridor, offering windows of uninterrupted horizon beneath a kaleidoscope of skies." Reception to the work inspired the multimedia project "Quotelahoma," where Alexander combined image and text to create "mash-ups of decontextualized lyrics and Oklahoma photographs, combined with some modern signs, vernacular sayings and quotes excerpted from interviews from around the state." Her street-art posters were installed in urban centers of Europe, becoming part of what she termed a "multi-layered, multi-lingual urban artscape of protest and proclamation. The words and images were familiar … and yet not. What did they mean? Was it a code? Philosophy? Advice? Wisdom? It was not for me to say. The answer is as inscrutable and enigmatic as the place where the wind comes sweepin’ down the plain."

Background
Alexander is a dual citizen of Canada and the United States, raised in the Upper Peninsula of Michigan. She attended a two-room schoolhouse before graduating from Vassar College and Columbia University Graduate School of Journalism. She is a veteran of the Associated Press in New York City and former head of the journalism department of Saint Michael's College in Vermont. She has been honored by Lake Superior State University in her hometown of Sault Ste. Marie with the Kenneth J. Shouldice Achievement Award for "personal and professional successes."

References

External links

 

American photojournalists
Vassar College alumni
Columbia University Graduate School of Journalism alumni
American portrait photographers
American women photographers
People from Sault Ste. Marie, Michigan
1961 births
Living people
Photographers from Oklahoma
21st-century American women
Women photojournalists